Khuzhir (Kharantsy) is an airport on Lake Baikal’s Olkhon Island servicing Khuzhir village. It's located near to Kharantsy.

The airport has humble facilities which were built in the middle of the 20th century.

Regular flights were cancelled in 1999, and only private planes occasionally have landed there. But even when it happened, old airport manager was keeping the runway and facilities on standby at all times on own initiative until he died in 2018. He believed regular flights from the island would be resumed.

SiLa airlines has revived regular carriage of passengers from/to there just only in September 2019.

Facilities 
The airport is capable of taking such aircraft suited to landing on unpaved airstrips as Antonov An-2, Antonov An-28, Cessna 208 Caravan.

Airlines and destinations

References

Airports in Irkutsk Oblast
Olkhon Island